Massimo Gramellini (born 2 October 1960) is an Italian writer and journalist currently working at Corriere della Sera.

Life and career

He was born in Turin in 1960 to a family from Romagna. At the age of nine he lost his mother, Giuseppina Pastore, to suicide: seriously ill and depressed, she threw herself from a building's fifth floor. Nobody wished to reveal the details to the young Massimo; his father told him that she had died of a sudden heart attack. This episode has made a great impression on him throughout his life. He discovered the truth many years later, in the mid-1990s, reading a 1969 newspaper article.

He has published books and articles about Italian society and politics, an almanac about 150 years of the history of Italy (with Carlo Fruttero), and two series of stories about his soccer team Torino F.C. In 2010, he published his first novel, L'ultima riga delle favole ("The last line of fables"), that sold over 250,000 copies in Italy and was translated into several languages. In 2012, he released his second novel, Fai bei sogni ("Have good dreams"), which was the best-selling book of 2012, selling over one million copies.

Starting in Autumn 2016, he has presented Le parole della settimana on the talk show Che tempo che fa.

After 28 years at newspaper La Stampa, he began working with Corriere della Sera in 2017.

On several occasions he was accused (notably by the Sinti) of being racist and using populist arguments in his columns Il Buongiorno and Il Caffè.

Personal life

He was married to journalist , daughter of lawyer Stefano Rodotà. He is now in a relationship with the italian writer , eighteen years younger. They have a son, Tommaso, born on 19 February 2019. He considers himself "a believer", but not Catholic.

Bibliography

 Compagni d'Italia, Milano, Sperling & Kupfer, 1997 .
 Buongiorno. Il meglio o comunque il meno peggio, Torino, La Stampa, 2002 .
 Buongiorno Piemonte, Scarmagno, photos by Livio Bourbon, Priuli & Verlucca, 2005 .
 Buongiorno Montagne Olimpiche, photos by Livio Bourbon, Scarmagno, Priuli & Verlucca, 2006 .
 Buongiorno Liguria, photos by Livio Bourbon, Scarmagno, Priuli & Verlucca, 2007 .
 Granata da legare, Ivrea, Priuli & Verlucca, 2006 .
 Ci salveranno gli ingenui, Milano, Longanesi, 2007 .
 Toro. I migliori derby della nostra vita, Scarmagno, Priuli & Verlucca, 2007 .
 Cuori allo specchio, Milano, Longanesi, 2008 .
 Buongiorno. Dieci anni, Torino, La Stampa, 2009 .
 L'ultima riga delle favole, Milano, Longanesi, 2010.
 La patria, bene o male, with Carlo Fruttero, Milano, Arnoldo Mondadori Editore, 2010 .
 Fai bei sogni, Milano, Longanesi, 2012 .
 La magia di un buongiorno, Milano, Longanesi, 2014 .
 Avrò cura di te, with Chiara Gamberale, Milano, Longanesi, 2014 .

Gallery

References

External links
 Biography on LibriBlog
 Biography on Zam

1960 births
Living people
Journalists from Turin
20th-century Italian journalists
Italian male journalists
20th-century Italian male writers
21st-century Italian journalists
21st-century Italian male writers
Writers from Turin
Italian Christians